Mazlina binti Hassan Nodin also known as Lana Nodin  is a model who became an actress in 2005. She was born 8 February 1980 at Kuching, Sarawak, Malaysia and became known as the Malaysian Pamela Anderson.

She is known for starring in the film Gol & Gincu (2005) and in Remp-It (2006).

Filmography 
 2015: Biasan
 2013: Tokak
 2012: Lagenda Budak Setan 2: Katerina
 2012: Pontianak vs. Orang Minyak
 2012: Chow Kit

References

External links
 Remp-It at filemkita.com (Malaysian movie database)
 http://www.murai.com.my/article/default.asp?article_id=144&c=6&s=22
 Remp-It at Gosip Malaysia (Gosip Artis Malaysia)

Malaysian female models
Living people
Malaysian actresses
People from Kuching
People from Sarawak
1980 births